Lost Temper Creek is a stream in North Slope Borough, Alaska, in the United States. It is a tributary of the Colville River.

Lost Temper Creek was by named in the 1950s by a government geologist from an unpleasant incident at the explorers' camp. Lost Temper Creek has been noted for its unusual place name.

See also
List of rivers of Alaska

References

Rivers of North Slope Borough, Alaska
Rivers of Alaska